Amanda Ng Ling Kai (born 3 May 1994) is a Singaporean sailor. She and Jovina Choo placed 20th in the women's 470 event at the 2016 Summer Olympics. She also placed 26th in the women's RS:X event at the 2020 Summer Olympics, placed 4th in the women's RS:X event at the 2018 Asian Games, and won a bronze medal in the women's Mistral One Design event at the 2011 Southeast Asian Games.

References

External links
 
 
 
 

1994 births
Living people
Singaporean female sailors (sport)
Olympic sailors of Singapore
Sailors at the 2016 Summer Olympics – 470
Sailors at the 2020 Summer Olympics – RS:X
Asian Games competitors for Singapore
Sailors at the 2018 Asian Games
Southeast Asian Games bronze medalists for Singapore
Southeast Asian Games medalists in sailing
Competitors at the 2011 Southeast Asian Games
21st-century Singaporean women
Singaporean windsurfers
Female windsurfers